Ancocala (possibly from Aymara janq'u white, qala stone, "white stone") is a  mountain in the Chila mountain range in the Andes of Peru. It is situated in the Arequipa Region, Castilla Province, Chachas District. Ancocala lies southwest of Pillune and the lake named Machucocha.

References

Mountains of Peru
Mountains of Arequipa Region